Anneliese: The Exorcist Tapes, or Paranormal Entity 3: The Exorcist Tapes, is a 2011 American found footage horror film directed by Jude Gerard Prest and distributed by The Asylum. It is based on the real-life exorcism of Anneliese Michel, a young woman thought to have been possessed. It is also a mockbuster of the film Paranormal Activity 3.

The film was released direct-to-video on March 1, 2011.

Cast

Release
The film premiered on DVD on March 1, 2011 in the United States, which includes the film itself and the actual video footage. In Australia, the film received a DVD release on September 21, 2011. In the UK, Anchor Bay Entertainment released the film on DVD under the name Paranormal Entity 3: The Exorcist Tapes on October 17, 2011.

In Germany, it was released on Blu-ray under the name Der Exorzismus der Anneliese M. on July 28, 2011.

Sequel

References

External links
 

2011 films
2011 independent films
2010s English-language films
2010s German-language films
2010s supernatural horror films
American supernatural horror films
The Asylum films
Found footage films
Films about exorcism
Direct-to-video horror films
2010s American films